Bolintin-Vale is a town in Giurgiu County, Muntenia, Romania with a population of 12,929 . The town administers three villages: Crivina, Malu Spart and Suseni. It is the second largest city in the county; proximity to the capital Bucharest has helped the local economy. It officially became a town in 1989, as a result of the Romanian rural systematization program.

Demographics

Bolintin-Vale is mainly populated by ethnic Romanians, who make up 79.2% of the population, even though it has a significant Romani minority (19.8%). In fact, Bolintin-Vale is the Romanian town with the third largest percentage of Roma people. Many of the Romani are refugees from neighbouring Bolintin-Deal, who settled here after the ethnic clashes from 1991.

As of 2011, the population breakdown of the city and the three adjacent villages was as follows: Bolintin-Vale 7,376, Malu Spart 3,126, Crivina 817, and Suseni 508.

Natives
 Dimitrie Bolintineanu
 Valeriu Lupu
 Florentin Matei

See also
 List of towns in Romania with large Roma populations

References

Towns in Romania
Populated places in Giurgiu County
Localities in Muntenia
Romani communities in Romania